Chyolva is a rural locality (a settlement) in Dobryansky District, Perm Krai, Russia. The population was 329 as of 2010. There are 10  streets.

Geography 
Chyolva is located 69 km northeast of Dobryanka (the district's administrative centre) by road. Omelichi is the nearest rural locality.

References 

Rural localities in Dobryansky District